The broad ligament of the uterus is the wide fold of peritoneum that connects the sides of the uterus to the walls and floor of the pelvis.

Structure

Subdivisions

Contents
The contents of the broad ligament include the following:

 Reproductive
 uterine tubes (or Fallopian tube)
 ovary (some sources consider the ovary to be on the broad ligament, but not in it.)
 vessels
 ovarian artery (in the suspensory ligament)
 uterine artery (in reality, travels in the cardinal ligament)
 ligaments
 ovarian ligament
 round ligament of uterus
 suspensory ligament of the ovary (Some sources consider it a part of the broad ligament, while other sources just consider it a "termination" of the ligament.)

Relations 
The peritoneum surrounds the uterus like a flat sheet that folds over its fundus, covering it anteriorly and posteriorly; on the sides of the uterus, this sheet of peritoneum comes in direct contact with itself, forming the double layer of peritoneum known as the broad ligament of the uterus.

The part where this peritoneal sheet is folded (i.e. the free edge) has the uterine tubes running between the two layers; this part is known as the mesosalpinx.

Function
The broad ligament serves as a mesentery for the uterus, ovaries, and the uterine tubes.  It helps in maintaining the uterus in its position, but it is not a major contributing factor.

Clinical significance 

Broad ligament hernias are rare. Due to their vague clinical presentation they are difficult to distinguish from other types of internal hernias, which can cause small bowel obstruction.

Additional images

See also
 Cardinal ligament
 Pelvic diaphragm
 Parametrium

References

External links
 
 
  - Mammal, female overview (Gross, Medium)"
 Diagram at med.mun.ca
 

Ligaments
Mammal female reproductive system